Central Chronicle is an English-language daily regional newspaper being published from Bhopal, Madhya Pradesh and Raipur, Chhattisgarh. The newspaper publishes about central India, containing a mix of local and national news. The original name of Central Chronicle was MP Chronicle when Madhya Pradesh and Chhattisgarh were one state. After 1 November 2000 it was changed to Central Chronicle when Raipur went to the parted state Chhattisgarh.

Editions
Central Chronicle is published from the following places:

References

English-language newspapers published in India
Mass media in Madhya Pradesh
Mass media in Chhattisgarh
Publications established in 1957
Daily newspapers published in India
1957 establishments in Madhya Pradesh